Eduard Linnemann (2 February 1841 – 4 April 1886) was a German chemist.

He studied chemistry at the University of Heidelberg and at the University of Karlsruhe. After he received his Ph.D. he worked with Kekulé at the University of Ghent and with Leopold von Pebal at the University of Lemberg. He was appointed professor at the University of Lemberg in 1865, changed to the University of Brno from 1872 until 1875 and then became professor at the University of Prague. He held this position until his death in 1886.

He is known for his investigations of mannitol and his analyses of zircon. In 1886, he proposed the name "austrium" for what he believed was a new chemical element.

Publications 
 Über das Unvermögen des Propylens sich mit Wasser zu verbinden, 1877 - On the inability of propylene to combine with water.
 Über die Absorptionserscheinungen in Zirkonen, 1885 - On the absorption phenomena of zircon.
 Das Oxydationsproduct des Propylenoxydes durch Silberoxyd, 1885 - The oxidation product of propylene oxides by silver.
 Verarbeitung und qualitative Zusammensetzung des Zirkons, 1885 - Processing and qualitative composition of zircon.
 Austrium, ein neues metallisches Element, 1886 - Austrium, a new metallic element.

References

1841 births
1886 deaths
19th-century German chemists
Heidelberg University alumni
Karlsruhe Institute of Technology alumni
Academic staff of Ghent University
Academic staff of the University of Lviv
Academic staff of German Technical University in Brno
Academic staff of Charles University
Scientists from Frankfurt